KV may refer to:

Places
 Kosovo, an Eastern European country
 KV (Egyptology), Kings' Valley, tombs in the Valley of the Kings, Egypt

Companies and organizations
 KV Pharmaceutical, a drug company
 KV Racing Technology, an auto racing team
 KV, the IATA designator for Sky Regional Airlines
 Kendriya Vidyalaya, a system of schools for the children of public servants in India
 Knattspyrnufélag Vesturbæjar, an Icelandic football club
 Kavminvodyavia, a Russian airline
 Swedish Prison and Probation Service, government agency
  (English:"Catholic Scouts"), part of Scouting Nederland

Science and technology
 Kv (flow factor), a measure of the flow factor of a liquid
 Kilovolt (kV), a unit of electric potential
 Motor velocity constant (Kv), of an electric motor
 Voltage-gated potassium channel (Kv), in cell biology
 Kv, a programming language implemented in Kivy
 Karnaugh-Veitch diagram, a logic optimization method
 key–value pair

Vehicles
 Kliment Voroshilov tank, a series of Soviet Second World War heavy tanks
 KV, prefix (NoCGV in English) for Norwegian Coast Guard vessels

Other uses
 Köchel-Verzeichnis, a catalogue of compositions by Mozart
 Komi language (ISO 639-1 code "kv"), spoken by the Komi peoples in the northeastern European part of Russia
 "KV" (fictional virus), the fictional viral plague from the 2007 film I Am Legend (film)

See also

 
 
 Koninklijke Voetbalvereniging (disambiguation)
 KVS (disambiguation)
 VK (disambiguation)
 V (disambiguation)
 K (disambiguation)